Cadyville is a hamlet (and census-designated place) in Clinton County, New York, United States. Cadyville has a post office with ZIP code 12918, which opened on July 25, 1840.

References

Hamlets in Clinton County, New York
Hamlets in New York (state)